In mathematics, corank is complementary to the concept of the rank of a mathematical object, and may refer to the dimension of the left nullspace of a matrix, the dimension of the cokernel of a linear transformation of a vector space, or the number of elements of a matroid minus its rank.

Left nullspace of a matrix 
The corank of an  matrix is  where  is the rank of the matrix. It is the dimension of the left nullspace and of the cokernel of the matrix.

Cokernel of a linear transformation 
Generalizing matrices to linear transformations of vector spaces, the corank of a linear transformation is the dimension of the cokernel of the transformation, which is the quotient of the codomain by the image of the transformation.

Matroid 
In the case of linear matroids this coincides with the matrix corank. In the case of graphic matroids the corank is also known as the circuit rank or cyclomatic number.

Linear algebra
Matroid theory